Swami Shyam (1924- February 2017), born in Chandani, Jalaun district, Uttar Pradesh, India, was raised in the Vedic tradition of Knowledge of the Self (Atma-gyan). Shyam has meditated, studied and been dedicated to this tradition since his early childhood, when his father invited Swami Ramanand, a guru from Uttar Pradesh, to live in their home. Swami Ramanand initiated the young Shyam in meditation, and the family home became a meeting place for satsang (the company of true knowledge) for those who lived in the region. Ramanand taught the Vedas, the Bhagavad Gita, the Srimad Bhagavatam and other scriptures, as well as meditation. In 1973 Shyam moved to Kullu, Valley of Gods, Himachal Pradesh, India.

Meditation and knowledge of the self are the essence of Shyam's teachings. He has meditated, studied and taught meditation throughout his life, and established organisations for the continuation of this work, such as the International Meditation Institute (IMI), which he founded in 1976 in Kullu; Shanti-Sneh Abhiyan, which he formed in 1986 in Kullu; and the Man-Friend Association, which he founded in the early 1960s in Chandigarh, India. In 1986, at the First International Yog Conference in New Delhi, Shyam was awarded the Yog Shiromani Award by the President of India, Giani Zail Singh, for his work in the field of meditation and self-realization and the 1974 Integrity Award presented by Geoff Stirling on behalf of Apache Communications in Gander, Newfoundland. Shyam has spoken by invitation to thousands of people throughout India and in Europe, North America and South America, at international conferences, organisations, universities and schools, as well as on television and radio.

The published works of Shyam include original works in English and Hindi, as well as translations with commentaries of ancient Sanskrit texts, published by the International Meditation Institute. (See below for a list of titles.) Some of these books have been translated into French, German, Hebrew, Punjabi, Norwegian and other languages. He wrote every day, sometimes several times, culminating in thousands of writings based on his own practice and inner research.

In addition to prose, Shyam had seven published volumes of poetry; he has written over 10,000 poems. His poetry speaks of the knowledge of the universal Self, meditation and the sense of love and devotion. It is written in classical meters, which are traditionally sung. Lauded twentieth- and twenty-first-century Hindi poets Mahadevi Varma and Gopaldas Neeraj, as well as scholars of Hindi literature, Laxmi Narayan and Ganpati Chandra Gupta, have written introductions to his published volumes of poetry. Academic theses have been written on his philosophy and his creative works (see selection listed below).

The basis of Shyam's teachings is meditation. The core of his teachings is the vision of oneness, the knowledge of I, you, or self, which he says is "pure, free, forever, birthless and deathless." This knowledge, he says, is unfolded through the practice of meditation, study and the application of that knowledge in a person's waking state. His mantra, "Amaram Hum Madhuram Hum", means, "I am eternal, I am blissful." It encapsulates the essence of Shyam's philosophy and teachings.

Books about Shyam 
Below is a selection of published books and PhD dissertations on the poetry, philosophy and life of Shyam:

(A) In Hindi:
• Shyam Sandesh: Swami Shyam ke Sakshatkar (Swami Shyam: Direct Experience) by Vishwaprakash Dixit "Batuk"
• Hindi Bhakti Yog Kavya Parampara aur Shyam Kavya (The Tradition of Hindi Bhakti Yog Poets and the Poet, Swami Shyam) by Rameshwar Prasad Dvivedi
• Swami Shyam: Vishwa-Sant tatha Guru Shreshth (Swami Shyam: Universal Saint and Guru Consciousness) by Anita Naiyyar (Shanti Prakashan, Rohtak, India, 2008.)
• Sant Surabhi by Sita Sharma, (Jalandhar, India) 
• Sadhana ke Swar (The Voice of Sadhana) by Suman Mishra. (Shyam Dhyan Kendra, Farrukhabad, India, 2010.)

(B) In English:
• Shyam Vedanant: A Comparison of Shankaracharya, Vivekanand and Swami Shyam by Rhonda Himes, Kurukshetra University, Kurukshetra, India.
• Genesis Dawn: I Meet Myself by Robert W. Eaton 
• Meditation, Oneness and Physics: A Journey through the Laboratories of Physics and Meditation by Glen Peter Kezwer (a study based on research in Physics and Swami Shyam's teachings). (Sterling Publishing, New Delhi, India.)

Books by Shyam 

Books in English
Meet Your True Self through Meditation, 1994
Raj Yog (with a Foreword by S. D. Tripathi, Punjab University; in English and Hindi), 1977, 2011
Doubtless Meditation, 2005
Life Never Knows Death (translated into Norwegian by Leif Ims), 2006
You, the Leading Awareness, 2012
Why Meditation? (in English, French, German, Hindi, Punjabi and Hebrew), 1983, 1988, 1994
Mastermind (translated into Hindi by Meenakshi Mishra), 1975
Shyam's Philosophy, 2003
Nine Yog Lessons (in English and German), 2003
Direction of Life
Message of Unity, 1986
The World Is Oneness, 2006 
How It All Happened, 2013 
A Human Being Should Know that the Self Never Dies, 2011

Translations of Sanskrit Texts
Bhagavad Gita, 1985
Bhagavad Gita: A Precise Rendering, 2001
Bhagavad Gita: The Importance of Human Life, 2009
Patanjali Yog Darshan (in English, German, French and Hindi), 1980, 1990, 2001
Light of Knowledge: Shankaracharya's Vivek Chudamani, 1977, 2011
The Avadhoot Gita, 2007
Ashtavakr Gita: Simplified Knowledge of the Self, 2001 
Ashtaavakr Gita: A Precise Study of the Human Mind, 2001
Ashtaawakr Gita: The Scripture of Knowledge for All Times, 1998

Books in Hindi
Dhyan Kyon? (translated into Punjabi by Manjeet Singh)
Patanjali Yog Darshan
Nirbandh Man (translation of Mastermind by Meenakshi Mishra)
Shyam Sudha (Introduction by Ganapati Chandra Gupta), 1981, 1990
Shyam Amrit (Introduction by Mahadevi Varma)
Shyam Jyoti, 1984
Shyam Amar (Introduction by Gopaldas Neeraj), 1989
Shyam Rang (Introduction by Laxmi Narayan)
Shyam Gitavali, 2002

Films about Shyam 

In 1977, Film Australia released a documentary film entitled Swami Shyam in the series Our Asian Neighbors: India, produced by Bruce Moir and directed by Chris Noonan. Film Australia summarised the documentary: "A guru and his followers live in an ashram in Kulu Valley, within the Himalayas. The audience is directly involved in experiencing an Indian Swami. The film ends with one of the Swami's three-minute lessons in meditation."

In 1995, Jean-Pierre Piché directed Sadhana: Back to the Source, a docu-drama in which a seeker meets four teachers from different parts of India. The fourth segment is his meeting with Shyam in the Himalayas, including an initiation into the technique of meditation.

References

External links 
 http://www.swamishyam.com – Information and books by Shyam
 http://www.shyamspace.com – General information

1924 births
2017 deaths
People from Jalaun district
20th-century Indian non-fiction writers
Writers from Uttar Pradesh
20th-century Indian male writers